Central Park is a large public, urban park in central Cluj-Napoca. It was founded in the 19th century and it located on the southern shore of Someşul Mic River. The Park is now home to the University of Arts and Design and to the Chemistry Faculty of the Babeş-Bolyai University.

During 2012, the Central Park was site of an important restoration process, especially for the building of the Old Casino.

Every year, the west half of the park is closed off as part of the Untold Festival.

Gallery

External links 

Parks in Romania
Tourist attractions in Cluj-Napoca